Omogymna richerti is a species of sea snail, a marine gastropod mollusk in the family Olividae, the olives. It was first described by E. A. Kay in 1979 as Oliva richerti. It has since been revised into Omogymna.

Distribution
This species occurs in the Pacific Ocean off Hawaii.

References

Olividae
Gastropods described in 1979